Gayeshpur Government Polytechnic,  is a new government polytechnic located in Gayeshpur (near Kalyani),  Nadia district, West Bengal. This polytechnic is affiliated to the West Bengal State Council of Technical Education,  and recognised by AICTE, New Delhi. This polytechnic offers diploma courses in Civil, Mechanical, and Survey Engineering.

References

Universities and colleges in Nadia district
Technical universities and colleges in West Bengal
2016 establishments in West Bengal
Educational institutions established in 2016